Hunawng is the name of several villages in Burma:

Hunawng (24°56"N 94°54"E) -Homalin Township, Sagaing Region
Hunawng (24°49"N 94°53"E) -Homalin Township, Sagaing Region